Joseph Byrne (21 November 1856 – 28 June 1880) was an Australian bushranger of Irish descent. A friend of Ned Kelly, he was a member of the "Kelly Gang" who were declared outlaws after the murder of three policemen at Stringybark Creek. Despite wearing the improvised body armour for which Ned Kelly and his gang are now famous (and which he is reputed to have designed), Byrne received a fatal gunshot during the gang's final violent confrontation with police at Glenrowan, in June 1880.

First years
Joe Byrne was born in 1856 in Woolshed, on the Reedy Creek flat 10km NW of Beechworth, Victoria. His father Patrick Byrne came from Carlow, Ireland (1831 Carlow Ireland- Nov 1870 Beechworth). He is buried at Benalla, Victoria. Joe's mother Margaret (née White) was born at Scariff, County Clare, Ireland. She was one of the "Irish Famine Girls" who immigrated to Sydney, Port Phillip and Adelaide from workhouses in every county of Ireland. These girls were given free passages to Australia due to poverty, death of their parents, or widowed parent unable to care for them during the Great Irish Famine. All, including Margaret, ended up in workhouses from where they were chosen to come to Australia via the Irish Famine Scheme between 1848 and 1850. Australia welcomed over 4,000 Irish 'orphan' girls during this period. Aged between 14 and 18, they were given the opportunity to make a new life in Australia. The Hyde Park Barracks in Sydney, operated as a depot where the girls were first accommodated, is home to the Irish Famine Memorial. Margaret White was the daughter of Denis White and Margaret Ryan who were both from Scariff, County Clare (only Margaret's father was listed as living in Scariff at the time of Margaret's departure to Australia). She came with many other young women on the ship 'Thomas Arbuthnot'. The ship's surgeon, Charles Strutt was a kind and compassionate man and accompanied over 100 of these young women on a journey south to Yass and Gundagai where they found work in suitable families. Margaret was indentured a servant girl [as most of these girls were] for an Irishman, Nathaniel Stephen Powell, who was a grazier and the local magistrate for at Bungendore NSW, near modern-day Canberra. 
She stayed at the Hyde Park Barracks for 40 days until she and many other girls were personally accompanied by Surgeon Charles Strutt to Nathaniel Powell's property 'Turella' in NSW. Sadly many of the records of the workhouses do not survive and that is the case for the Scariff workhouse in County Clare where Margaret was before she emigrated.

Joe Byrne commenced school at the Catholic school at Woolshed in 1862. He was a good student, normally among the top students in his class and developed a reputation as a "flash writer". He also became very good friends with fellow student Aaron Sherritt. However, Byrne's father Patrick developed heart disease and Byrne's school results suffered. He finished school in 1869 with a fifth-grade education while his father died in the same year from heart disease. Joe Byrne also learnt how to speak Cantonese from nearby Chinese gold miners and learned how to smoke opium.

Byrne and Sheritt became close friends and found themselves in trouble with the law by falling foul of a local, corrupt police constable. Byrne made his first appearance in court in 1871 on the charge of illegally using a horse, and had to pay a fine of 20 shillings to avoid going to jail. Byrne and Sherritt were later convicted of stealing a bullock and served six months in HM Prison Beechworth. During this imprisonment, Byrne and Sherritt met Jim Kelly who was the brother of Ned Kelly and Dan Kelly. Joe Byrne met Ned in 1876 and the pair soon became firm friends.

The Kelly Gang

Dan Kelly had discovered an abandoned gold diggings at Bullock Creek, which was worked by the Kelly brothers, Byrne, Sherritt, and Steve Hart during the next couple of years. Byrne was likely present at the Kelly homestead on 15 April 1878 when Constable Fitzpatrick claimed that Ned Kelly shot him and Ellen Kelly, Ned's mother, hit him over the head with a shovel. Afterwards, Ned and Dan Kelly fled to Bullock Creek with a 100-pound bounty on their heads and Ellen Kelly was sentenced to three years hard labour for assaulting a police officer.

Joe Byrne was present at Stringybark Creek with the Kelly brothers and Steve Hart on 26 October 1878 when they surprised a patrol of four police officers on their trail, with three of them shot dead. The gang were declared as outlaws for this incident on 15 November 1878 and a price of £2000 (equivalent to approximately A$754,000 in 2008) was placed on their heads.

The Kelly Gang started developing a strategy with Byrne acting as Kelly's lieutenant, always being consulted about strategy. The Kelly Gang robbed the Euroa branch of the National Bank of Australia stealing over £2,000 which was the largest heist to that point. Joe Byrne drafted the Euroa letter (now known as the Cameron letter) in red ink sent by Ned Kelly to Donald Cameron, a local MLC. claiming that justice had not been done in the case of his mother and himself. It concluded "For I need no lead or powder to revenge my cause, And if words be louder I will oppose your laws."

The police locked up over 20 alleged supporters of the Kelly gang between 3 January 1879 and 22 April 1879 under the Felons Apprehension Act 1878. This cemented public support for the gang especially in northeast Victoria. Joe Byrne was able to use this support to advantage by penning a number of bush ballads about the exploits of Kelly and his gang.

Joe Byrne frequently visited his mother at her house in Beechworth and was also seen carousing in bars in the town, despite having a price on his head. This was due to a combination of his skill and daring, the incompetence of the police and the support of local residents for the Kelly Gang. There was a Royal Commission into the Victorian Police in 1881 after the capture of the Kelly Gang because of the deficiencies exposed by the Gang.

Kelly and Byrne started planning their next raid at Jerilderie. On 10 February 1879, dressed as police officers, the gang raided the Bank of NSW branch at Jerilderie taking another £2,000. Prior to the raid, Byrne composed the Jerilderie Letter which supported the creation of a Republic of North-eastern Victoria. The proceeds of both the Euroa and Jerilderie robberies were distributed amongst the gang's family, friends and supporters. The Kelly gang shouted the bar at Jerilderie which further enhanced their reputation.

After the Jerilderie raid, the gang laid low for 16 months evading capture. This aided to their reputation and greatly embarrassed the government of Victoria and the police. The Victorian Government eventually increased the reward for capture of a member of the Kelly Gang to £8,000 (equivalent to two million Australian dollars in 2005).

Siege of Glenrowan

Byrne started plans with Kelly for another bank robbery in Benalla in 1880. However, they were becoming increasingly concerned about Sherritt who they feared was being targeted by police as an informant. While Byrne had previously used Sherritt to persuade the police that the gang was planning a raid in the Goulburn River rather than at Jerilderie, both Kelly and Byrne believed that he had turned informant. This prompted Byrne and Dan Kelly to murder Sherritt as an informer on 26 June 1880.

The following day, the Kelly Gang took over Glenrowan, first tearing up the railway line in anticipation of a special trainload of police being sent to capture them. They held over 60 people hostage in the town. Thomas Curnow, the schoolmaster of the local school who had won Kelly's trust, escaped and warned the train crew who in turn told the police. This enabled 34 police to surround the Glenrowan Hotel where the bushrangers had again shouted the bar.

Joe Byrne is believed to have been heavily involved in designing the armour worn by all members of the Kelly Gang at the siege of Glenrowan. His armour did not prevent him from being shot in the groin by a stray bullet which severed his femoral artery. Eyewitnesses at the hotel claimed that a moment before the bullet struck Joe Byrne dead, he offered the toast "Here's to the bold Kelly Gang!". Another report states that he said "Many more years in the bush for the Kelly Gang!". He died from loss of blood on 28 June 1880. The next day his body was hung on the door of the lock-up at Benalla and photographed by the press. His family did not claim the body, and the police refused to hand it over to sympathisers, fearing a funeral would become a rallying point for the simmering rebellion. He was buried on the same day as Aaron Sherritt. Dan Kelly and Steve Hart also died on the day of the siege by shooting themselves, although there is no concrete evidence of a suicide by Dan Kelly and Steve Hart while Ned Kelly was captured and tried in Melbourne. Ned Kelly was hanged at Old Melbourne Gaol on 11 November 1880. There is a legend that Kelly and Byrne had drafted a Declaration of a Republic of Northeast Victoria which was discovered in Kelly's possession at his capture and was destroyed by the Victorian Government.

Modern discoveries
In September 2006, Darren Sutton found a piece of armour believed to be an offcut from Joe Byrne's armour in bushland near Beechworth, Victoria.
The armour is thought to have been created by local blacksmith Charlie Knight and friend Thomas Straughair for the Kelly Gang.

According to Heritage Victoria this is not considered to be from the same metal as the suit of armour made for Joe Byrne.

Cultural References
In the 2003 film Ned Kelly, Byrne was played by Orlando Bloom.  Mark McManus portrayed Byrne in the 1970 film Ned Kelly.

References

External links

Glenrowan 1880 Joe Byrne page
ABC Online page on Ned Kelly
La Trobe University media release on speech by Chief Justice of Victoria on the North Eastern Republic of Victoria
Speech by Victorian Chief Justice John Phillips, Chief Justice of Victoria, at La Trobe University on The North-Eastern Victoria Republic Movement: Myth or Reality

1857 births
1880 deaths
Australian bank robbers
Bushrangers
Australian outlaws
Australian people of Irish descent
People from Beechworth
Deaths by firearm in Victoria (Australia)
People shot dead by law enforcement officers in Australia